Beans is a 2000 Turkish comedy mafia film directed by Bora Tekay and written by Haluk Özenç.

Cast
Selim Erdoğan as The young man
Elvin Beşikçioğlu as  The girl
Bülent Kayabaş as  The boss
Burak Sergen as  The killer or 'The one without milk'
Taner Barlas as The father
Haluk Özenç as The courier or 'The one with milk'
Haluk Bilginer as The imaginary old man
Özlem Eren as  Sister
Gürkan Uygun

References

External links 

2000 films
2000s Turkish-language films
2000s crime comedy films
Films about organized crime in Turkey
Films set in Turkey
Turkish crime comedy films
2000 comedy films